Aga is a town in Egypt, located in the governorate of Dakahlia. Markaz Aga had a population of 548,634 in 2019.

References 

Cities in Egypt
Populated places in Dakahlia Governorate